Mahakali was one of the fourteen zones located in the Far-Western Development Region of Nepal, covering an area of 6,205 km2 in the most western part of the country. It stretches along Nepal's far western border with India, marked by the Kali River or Mahakali River.

In 2015 Nepal discontinued use of zone designations in favor of provinces. The zone formerly known as Mahakali is now part of Sudurpashchim Province.

Mahakali's headquarters is Bhimdatta (formerly called Mahendranagar) in Kanchanpur District. The zone covers the Himalayan range including Api Peak in the North, Hill valleys, Inner Terai valleys such as Patan Municipality in Baitadi District in the center and the outer Terai in the South. The name of this zone is derived from the Kali River.

Geography 

The boundary of this region was Kali river on the west and Seti Zone on the east. After the Sugauli Treaty (also spelled Segowlee) was signed on December 2, 1815 and ratified on March 4, 1816, between the British East India Company and The Kingdom of Nepal; Kali river which originates from Limpiyadhura, became the international boundary with  the United Provinces of British India (now Uttarakhand, India). The coldest area in the zone is Byash and the hottest is Kanchanpur. The Api Himalayas lie in this zone from where Chameliya river originates.

Administrative subdivisions 
Mahakali was divided into four districts; since 2015 these districts have been redesignated as part of Sudurpashchim Province.

Language, culture and history 
Mahakali Zone of Nepal has a distinct language, culture and history. Various dialects of Kumauni  language are spoken in this region. Even in the Kanchanpur District 80% of the people speak Kumauni language. Dotiyali dialect of Kumauni language is spoken in Dadeldhura District and Baitada dialect of Kumauni language is spoken in Baitadi and Darchula districts.

Gora is a famous festival observed in Mahakali Zone. In ancient times, this region was a part of the Katyuri kingdom. After its collapse, this zone became a part of Doti kingdom, a branch of the Katyuri Kings. Brahmadev Mandir in Kanchanpur District was built during the reign of the Katyuri king Brahmadev.

Important cities 
The largest city in the Mahakali Zone is Bhimdatta (or Bhim Datta, formerly called Mahendranagar), which is also the headquarters of Kanchanpur District. Other main towns of Mahakali Zone are Dashrathchand, Patan (Baitadi) and Darchula Bajar.

The Amargadhi, the district headquarters, is named after General Amarshing Thapa (a famous Gorkha General) who formed a fort to expand Gorkha Empire capturing Kumaoun state after had defeated in a previous war with Kumaoun during 1790 A.D.

Rajghat is also a famous city of Kanchanpur District.  It is located at Raikawar Bichawa VDC.

There are 3 municipalities in Kanchanpur District.

Protected areas 
Mahakali Zone hosts the Sukla Phanta Wildlife Reserve in Kanchanpur District in the Terai, which covers an area of 305 km2 and surrounded by a buffer zone of 243.5 km2.

See also
 Development Regions of Nepal (Former)
 List of zones of Nepal (Former)
 List of districts of Nepal

References 
 Pande, B.D. (1993) History of Kumaun. Shree Almora Book Depot. ,

External links
 Government of Nepal: The Population and Socio-Economic Atlas of Nepal

Sudurpashchim Province
Zones of Nepal
2015 disestablishments in Nepal